Madame Butterfly is a 1954 musical film directed by Carmine Gallone and starring Kaoru Yachigusa, Nicola Filacuridi and Michiko Tanaka. It is based on Giacomo Puccini's opera, Madama Butterfly which is based on David Belasco's short story of the same name.

Cast
 Kaoru Yachigusa as Madame Butterfly, sung by Orietta Moscucci
 Nicola Filacuridi as Pinkerton, sung by Giuseppe Campora
 Michiko Tanaka as Suzuki, sung by Gianna Maria Canale
 Ferdinando Lidonni as Sharpless, the Consul
 Kiyoshi Takagi as Goro, sung by Paolo Carloni
 Yoshio Kosugi as Bonze, sung by Plinio Clabassi
 Tetsu Nakamura as Yamadori, sung by Adelio Zagonara
 Josephine Corry as Kate Pinkerton

Production
Madame Butterfly was shot at Cinecittà Studios in Rome between October and December 1954.

Release
Madame Butterfly was distributed theatrically in Japan on 3 June 1955. It was released in the United States by I.F.E. in Italian with English subtitles on 23 April 1956. It was reissued in 1970 by Cinemation Industries.

References

Bibliography

External links

1954 films
1954 musical films
Italian musical films
Japanese musical films
1950s Italian-language films
Films based on works by Giuseppe Giacosa
Films directed by Carmine Gallone
Films based on operas by Giacomo Puccini
Toho films
Opera films
1950s Japanese films
1950s Italian films